Quiet Logistics is a third-party logistics (3PL) company headquartered in Devens, Massachusetts. Quiet specializes in providing order fulfillment and returns management services to e-commerce retailers. In November 2021, American Eagle Outfitters announced that it would acquire Quiet Logistics for $350 million in cash.

Early years
Quiet Logistics was co-founded in 2009 by Bruce Welty and Michael Johnson.  Both have backgrounds in supply chain management, having co-founded, in 1987, warehouse management system (WMS) vendor Allpoints Systems, in Norwood, Massachusetts, and, in 2003, Scenic Technologies Corp.  Quiet was the first third-party logistics company to use Kiva Systems' warehouse robotics system.  Kiva's system-directed robots transport in-bound and out-bound products throughout a warehouse, reducing labor costs and increasing inventory and order-fulfillment accuracy.  In 2013, Quiet's use of this system was examined by Steve Kroft in a CBS 60 Minutes segment titled, March of the Machines.  And in 2015, Quiet's operating model, including its early adoption of Kiva's robots, was the subject of a Harvard Business Review case study.

Creation of Locus Robotics
In 2014, Quiet Logistics lost access to Kiva's robotics system when Amazon, who had acquired Kiva Systems in 2012 for $775MM, informed Quiet that use of the system was being limited to Amazon's own operations and, therefore, its contract with Quiet would not be renewed.  Unable to find a replacement robotics system that met its requirements, Quiet designed and built its own and integrated the system with its warehouse management system.  Quiet's solution is a collaborative robot that is both system-directed and able to interact with existing fulfillment center employees. In 2015, Quiet spun off its robotics division as a separate company, located in Wilmington, Massachusetts. Quiet continues to use the Locus robots, now marketed as LocusBots, in its facilities.

"Fulfillment centers" and geographic expansion
Quiet Logistics operates two "fulfillment centers" in Devens, Massachusetts, and one in Hazelwood, Missouri.  Quiet's newest facility, measuring 355,000 square feet, opened in 2018 in Devens.

Customers
Quiet Logistics focuses primarily on e-commerce retailers of fashion, fashion accessories, and home goods. Previous customers include Gilt and Zara.  Current customers include Away, Bonobos and Love Your Melon.

Acquisition by American Eagle Outfitters
American Eagle Outfitters announced a $350 million acquisition of Quiet Logistics on November 2, 2021. The company's Chief operating officer stated the company would remain independent. The acquisition was completed on December 29, 2021.

References 

2009 establishments in Massachusetts
Transportation companies based in Massachusetts
2021 mergers and acquisitions
American companies established in 2009
Transport companies established in 2009
Logistics companies of the United States
Companies based in Middlesex County, Massachusetts
American corporate subsidiaries